Meilan Lake is the name of a station on Shanghai Metro Line 7.

This station is the northern terminus of Line 7, and was opened on December 28, 2010. It is part of the second phase of Line 7. The station is located in the town of Luodian, in Shanghai's Baoshan District.

Railway stations in Shanghai
Shanghai Metro stations in Baoshan District
Railway stations in China opened in 2010
Line 7, Shanghai Metro